Mickey's is a brand of malt liquor made by the Miller Brewing Company.  It has a 5.6% ABV.

The brand was created by Sterling Brewery in Evansville, Indiana, which brewed it from 1962 through 1972. It is known for its bright green barrel-shaped, waffle-ribbed wide-mouthed 12-ounce bottle. It features an image of a hornet on the label and the cap, and rebus puzzles beneath it.

At some point Mickey began to sponsor the Ultimate Fighting Championship, using the phrase, "Get Stung", and has featured several UFC fighters on 24 ounce cans. Mickey's is also available in 12, 16, 22, 32, and 40 ounce sizes.

Popular culture
There is a reference to Mickey's in the track "Frank's Wild Years" by Tom Waits on his 1983 album Swordfishtrombones where, on his way home from work, the song’s title character "stopped at the liquor store, picked up a couple of Mickey's Big Mouths, and drank them in the car down by the Shell station."

References

External links
Historic Evansville - Sterling Brewery
Miller Brewing Company
Mickeys.com

American beer brands
SABMiller